Echthodopa is a genus of robber flies in the family Asilidae. There are at least four described species in Echthodopa.

Species
These four species belong to the genus Echthodopa:
 Echthodopa carolinensis Bromley, 1951
 Echthodopa formosa Loew, 1872
 Echthodopa pubera Loew, 1866
 Echthopoda pubera Loew, 1866

References

Further reading

 
 
 

Asilidae genera
Articles created by Qbugbot